Dame Susan Jocelyn Bell Burnell  (Bell; born 15 July 1943) is an astrophysicist from Northern Ireland who, as a postgraduate student, discovered the first radio pulsars in 1967. The discovery eventually earned the Nobel Prize in Physics in 1974; however, she was not one of the prize's recipients.

The paper announcing the discovery of pulsars had five authors. Bell's thesis supervisor Antony Hewish was listed first, Bell second. Hewish was awarded the Nobel Prize, along with the astronomer Martin Ryle. At the time fellow astronomer Sir Fred Hoyle criticised Bell's omission. In 1977, Bell Burnell commented, "I believe it would demean Nobel Prizes if they were awarded to research students, except in very exceptional cases, and I do not believe this is one of them." She would later state that "the fact that I was a graduate student and a woman, together, demoted my standing in terms of receiving a Nobel prize." The Royal Swedish Academy of Sciences, in its press release announcing the prize, cited Ryle and Hewish for their pioneering work in radio-astrophysics, with particular mention of Ryle's work on aperture-synthesis technique and Hewish's decisive role in the discovery of pulsars.

Bell Burnell was president of the Royal Astronomical Society from 2002 to 2004, president of the Institute of Physics from October 2008 until October 2010, and interim president of the Institute following the death of her successor, Marshall Stoneham, in early 2011.

In 2018, she was awarded the Special Breakthrough Prize in Fundamental Physics. Following the announcement of the award, she decided to use the $3 million (£2.3 million) prize money to establish a fund to help female, minority and refugee students become physics researchers. The fund is administered by the Institute of Physics. In 2021, Bell Burnell became the second female recipient (after Dorothy Hodgkin in 1976) of the Copley Medal.

Early life and education 

Bell Burnell was born in Lurgan,  Northern Ireland to M. Allison and G. Philip Bell. Their country home was called "Solitude" and she grew up there with her younger brother and two younger sisters. Her father was an architect who helped design the Armagh Planetarium, and during her visits there, the staff encouraged her to pursue a career in astronomy. She also enjoyed her father's books on astronomy.

She grew up in Lurgan and attended the Preparatory Department of Lurgan College from 1948 to 1956. At the time, boys could study technical subjects, but girls were expected to study subjects such as cooking and cross-stitching. Bell Burnell was able to study science only after her parents and others challenged the school's policies.

She failed the eleven-plus exam and her parents sent her to The Mount School, a Quaker girls' boarding school in York, England, where she graduated from in 1961. There she was favourably impressed by her physics teacher, Mr. Tillott, and stated: 

Bell Burnell was the subject of the first part of the BBC Four three-part series Beautiful Minds, directed by Jacqui Farnham.

Career and research 

She graduated from the University of Glasgow with a Bachelor of Science degree in Natural Philosophy (physics), with honours, in 1965 and obtained a PhD degree from the University of Cambridge in 1969. At Cambridge, she attended New Hall, Cambridge, and worked with Hewish and others to construct the Interplanetary Scintillation Array just outside Cambridge to study quasars, which had recently been discovered.

On 28 November 1967, she detected a "bit of scruff" on her chart-recorder papers that tracked across the sky with the stars. The signal had been visible in data taken in August, but as the papers had to be checked by hand, it took her three months to find it. She established that the signal was pulsing with great regularity, at a rate of about one pulse every one and a third seconds. Temporarily dubbed "Little Green Man 1" (LGM-1) the source (now known as PSR B1919+21) was identified after several years as a rapidly rotating neutron star. This was later documented by the BBC Horizon series. In a 2020 lecture at Harvard, she related how the media was covering the discovery of pulsars, with interviews taking a standard "disgusting" format: Hewish would be asked on the astrophysics, and she would be the "human interest" part, asked about vital statistics, how many boyfriends she had, what colour is her hair, and asked to undo some buttons for the photographs. The Daily Telegraph science reporter shortened "pulsating radio source" to pulsar.

She worked at the University of Southampton between 1968 and 1973, University College London from 1974 to 82 and the Royal Observatory, Edinburgh (1982–91). From 1973 to 1987 she was a tutor, consultant, examiner, and lecturer for the Open University. In 1986, she became the project manager for the James Clerk Maxwell Telescope on Mauna Kea, Hawaii, a position she held until 1991. She was Professor of Physics at the Open University from 1991 to 2001. She was also a visiting professor at Princeton University in the United States and Dean of Science at the University of Bath (2001–04), and President of the Royal Astronomical Society between 2002 and 2004.

Bell Burnell was visiting Professor of Astrophysics at the University of Oxford, and a Fellow of Mansfield College in 2007. She was President of the Institute of Physics between 2008 and 2010. In February 2018 she was appointed Chancellor of the University of Dundee. In 2018, Bell Burnell visited Parkes, NSW, to deliver the keynote John Bolton lecture at the Central West Astronomical Society (CWAS) AstroFest event.

In 2018, she was awarded the Special Breakthrough Prize in Fundamental Physics, worth three million dollars (£2.3 million), for her discovery of radio pulsars. The Special Prize, in contrast to the regular annual prize, is not restricted to recent discoveries. She donated all of the money "to fund women, under-represented ethnic minority and refugee students to become physics researchers", the funds to be administered by the Institute of Physics.

Issued in July 2022, Ulster Bank's new science-themed polymer £50 bank note prominently features Bell Burnell alongside other women, including those working in NI's life sciences industry. She said, "I'm passionate about encouraging more women to pursue scientific careers and I think it's something that is very important for Northern Ireland. There is a burgeoning scientific sector here. More women pursuing careers in science will support that ongoing growth."

Nobel Prize controversy 
Controversially, Bell did not receive recognition in the 1974 Nobel Prize in Physics. Bell later said that she had to be persistent in reporting the anomaly in the face of scepticism from Hewish, who initially insisted it was due to interference and man-made. She spoke of meetings held by Hewish and Ryle to which she was not invited. In 1977, she remarked that graduate students should not be awarded Nobel Prizes, except in very exceptional cases, and doubted whether her discovery was exceptional enough to merit the award. Feryal Özel, an astrophysicist at the University of Arizona, characterized her contributions as follows:

In later years, she opined that "the fact that I was a graduate student and a woman, together, demoted my standing in terms of receiving a Nobel prize."  The decision continues to be debated to this day.

Awards 
 The Albert A. Michelson Medal of the Franklin Institute of Philadelphia (1973, jointly with Dr. Hewish).
 J. Robert Oppenheimer Memorial Prize from the Center for Theoretical Studies, University of Miami (1978).
 Beatrice M. Tinsley Prize of the American Astronomical Society (1986).
 Herschel Medal of the Royal Astronomical Society (1989).
 Jansky Lectureship before the National Radio Astronomy Observatory (1995).
 Magellanic Premium of the American Philosophical Society (2000).
 Elected a Fellow of the Royal Society (FRS) (March 2003).
 Elected a Fellow of the Royal Society of Edinburgh (FRSE) (2004).
 William E. Gordon and Elva Gordon distinguished lecture at the Arecibo Observatory on 27 June 2006.
 The Grote Reber Medal at the General Assembly of the International Union of Radio Science (URSI) in Istanbul (19 August 2011)
 Lise-Meitner-Lecture at the Technical University Vienna (2013)
 The Royal Medal of the Royal Society (2015).
 The Women of the Year Prudential Lifetime Achievement Award (2015)
 The Institute of Physics President's Medal (2017)
 Grande Médaille of the French Academy of Sciences (2018)
 Special Breakthrough Prize in Fundamental Physics (2018)
 23rd Annual Katzenstein Distinguished Lecture at the University of Connecticut (2019)
 Gold Medal of the Royal Astronomical Society (2021)
 The Royal Society's Copley Medal (2021)
 The Astronomische Gesellschaft's Karl Schwarzschild Medal (2021)
 The Prix Jules Janssen of the Société astronomique de France (2022)

Honours 
 In 1999, she was appointed Commander of the Order of the British Empire (CBE) for services to Astronomy and promoted to Dame Commander of the Order of the British Empire (DBE) in 2007.
 In February 2013, she was assessed as one of the 100 most powerful women in the United Kingdom by Woman's Hour on BBC Radio 4.
 She was recognized as one of the BBC's 100 women of 2014.
 In February 2014, she was elected President of the Royal Society of Edinburgh, the first woman to hold that office. She held the position from April 2014 to April 2018 when she was succeeded by Dame Anne Glover.
 In 2016, the Institute of Physics renamed their award for early-career female physicists the Jocelyn Bell Burnell Medal and Prize.
 In 2016, she was elected an International member of the American Philosophical Society.
 In 2020, she was elected a Legacy Fellow of the American Astronomical Society.
 A painting of her by Stephen Shankand, commissioned by the Royal Society, was added to the collection in the Society's Carlton House Terrace headquarters in November 2020.
 In 2020, she was included by the BBC in a list of seven important but little-known British female scientists.
 In 2020, she was made an Honorary Fellow of Trinity College Dublin.

Publications 
Her publications include:

Personal and non-academic life 
Bell Burnell is house patron of Burnell House at Cambridge House Grammar School in Ballymena. She has campaigned to improve the status and number of women in professional and academic posts in the fields of physics and astronomy.

Quaker activities and beliefs 
From her school days, she has been an active Quaker and served as Clerk to the sessions of Britain Yearly Meeting in 1995, 1996 and 1997. Bell Burnell also served as Clerk of the Central Executive Committee of Friends World Committee for Consultation from 2008 to 2012. She delivered a Swarthmore Lecture under the title Broken for Life, at Yearly Meeting in Aberdeen on 1 August 1989, and was the plenary speaker at the US Friends General Conference Gathering in 2000. She spoke of her personal religious history and beliefs in an interview with Joan Bakewell in 2006.

Bell Burnell served on the Quaker Peace and Social Witness Testimonies Committee, which produced Engaging with the Quaker Testimonies: a Toolkit in February 2007. In 2013 she gave a James Backhouse Lecture which was published in a book entitled A Quaker Astronomer Reflects: Can a Scientist Also Be Religious?, in which Burnell reflects about how cosmological knowledge can be related to what the Bible, Quakerism or Christian faith states.

Marriage 
In 1968, between the discovery of the second and third pulsar, Bell became engaged to Martin Burnell and they married soon after; the couple divorced in 1993 after separating in 1989. In a 2021 online lecture at the University of Bedfordshire, Bell Burnell reflected on her first experience returning to the observatory wearing an engagement ring. Though she was proud of her ring and wanted to share the good news with her colleagues, she instead received criticism as, at the time, it was shameful for women to work as it appeared that their partners were incapable of providing for the family. Her husband was a local government officer, and his career took them to various parts of Britain. She worked part-time for many years while raising their son, Gavin Burnell, who is a member of the condensed matter physics group at the University of Leeds.

See also
 Timeline of women in science
 Nobel Prize controversies

Notes

Citations

Works cited 

 For the follow-up paper, see .

 For the first paper (announcing the discovery), see .

 (includes 16-minute video)

Further reading

External links 

 Oral history interview transcript with Jocelyn Bell Burnell on 21 May 2000, American Institute of Physics, Niels Bohr Library & Archives
 Freeview video "Tick, Tick, Pulsating Star: How I Wonder What You Are?" A Royal Institution Discourse by the Vega Science Trust (accessed 24 December 2007).
 Counterbalance Library: Bell Burnell talk "Science and the Spiritual Quest" (24 Minutes) (Accessed 7 April 2010).
 University of Manchester – Jodcast Interview with Jocelyn Bell-Burnell
 Biographical article, indicating Bell Burnell's beliefs and personal life, from California State Polytechnic University NOVA project. (Accessed 24 December 2007).
 Irishwoman who discovered the "lighthouses of the universe" Irish Times profile.

1943 births
20th-century educators from Northern Ireland
20th-century women educators
21st-century educators from Northern Ireland
21st-century women educators
Academics of the Open University
Academics of UCL Mullard Space Science Laboratory
Academics of the University of Bath
Academics of the University of Southampton
Alumni of New Hall, Cambridge
Alumni of the University of Glasgow
Astronomers from Northern Ireland
BBC 100 Women
British astrophysicists
British women physicists
British women scientists
Chancellors of the University of Dundee
Dames Commander of the Order of the British Empire
Educators from Northern Ireland
Fellows of the American Astronomical Society
Fellows of the Institute of Physics
Fellows of the Royal Astronomical Society
Female Fellows of the Royal Society
Foreign associates of the National Academy of Sciences
Honorary Fellows of Trinity College Dublin
Living people
Members of the American Philosophical Society
People educated at Lurgan College
People educated at The Mount School, York
Physicists from Northern Ireland
Presidents of the Institute of Physics
Presidents of the Royal Astronomical Society
Presidents of the Royal Society of Edinburgh
Quakers from Northern Ireland
Scientists from Belfast
Winners of the Beatrice M. Tinsley Prize
Women astronomers
Women educators from Northern Ireland